Kenneth Kim P. Ighalo (born January 11, 1989) is a Nigerian-Filipino professional basketball player for the NLEX Road Warriors of the Philippine Basketball Association (PBA). He was drafted by the Kia Sorento in the 2014 PBA draft. He plays the small forward position.

PBA career statistics

As of the end of 2022–23 season

Season-by-season averages

|-
| align=left | 
| align=left | Kia
| 16 || 12.0 || .289 || .091 || .500 || 1.8 || .6 || .2 || .1 || 2.0
|-
| align=left | 
| align=left | NLEX
| 9 || 8.7 || .235 || .000 || .500 || 1.6 || .7 || .2 || .2 || 1.0
|-
| align=left | 
| align=left | NLEX
| 31 || 15.9 || .396 || .304 || .771 || 3.3 || .9 || .4 || .1 || 5.1
|-
| align=left | 
| align=left | NLEX
| 36 || 22.6 || .422 || .391 || .831 || 3.6 || 1.2 || .5 || .2 || 8.6
|-
| align=left | 
| align=left | NLEX
| 10 || 9.8 || .423 || .267 || — || 2.1 || .4 || .0 || .1 || 2.6
|-
| align=left | 
| align=left | NLEX
| 20 || 11.5 || .431 || .313 || .857 || 1.8 || .5 || .2 || .2 || 3.6
|-
| align=left | 
| align=left | NLEX
| 19 || 9.2 || .256 || .235 || .833 || 1.7 || .2 || .5 || .0 || 1.5
|-class=sortbottom
| align=center colspan=2 | Career
| 141 || 14.8 || .390 || .324 || .784 || 2.6 || .7 || .3 || .1 || 4.5

References

External links

1989 births
Living people
Filipino men's basketball players
Filipino people of Nigerian descent
Terrafirma Dyip players
Mapúa Cardinals basketball players
NLEX Road Warriors players
Shooting guards
Small forwards
Basketball players from Manila
Terrafirma Dyip draft picks